MDRC is a nonprofit, nonpartisan education and social policy research organization based in New York City; Washington, DC; and Oakland and Los Angeles, California.

History 
In 1974, the Ford Foundation and six government agencies together created the Manpower Demonstration Research Corporation. Its purpose was to implement and document the results of new programs intended to help the poor. In the 1980s and 1990s, it became known for its evaluations of state welfare-to-work programs. It formally retired its original name and adopted "MDRC" as its registered corporate identity in 2003.

MDRC works across the United States, in Canada, and in the United Kingdom. Their 2021 budget is $66 million, which they derive from government contracts, foundations, corporations and individuals.

Projects 
MDRC projects are in these main areas:
Preschool through twelfth-grade education
 Postsecondary education
 Disconnected youth
 Work and income security
 Low-wage workers and communities
 Criminal justice
Behavioral science
Data science

Accomplishments 
MDRC helped pioneer the use of random assignment to test social programs.  Its evaluations of welfare work programs influenced the welfare reform of the 1990s. In the 1990s and 2000s, MDRC's evaluation of the Career Academies high school reform model, which showed impacts on participants' earnings eight years after graduation, influenced the expansion of the model around the nation.   MDRC was the intermediary for the first social impact bond demonstration in the United States, a project to reduce recidivism among 16- to 18-year-olds incarcerated at Rikers Island. MDRC's study of the City University of New York's Accelerated Study in Associate Programs (ASAP) has demonstrated that the program has doubled the three-year graduation rate of students who begin college requiring remedial education.

Leadership 

 Virginia Knox, President
 Jesús Amadeo, Senior Vice President
 Dan Bloom, Senior Vice President
 Rose Kob, Vice President and General Counsel
 John Martinez, Vice President

Affiliated people
 Judith M. Gueron
 Cecilia Rouse
 Bridget T. Long

References

External links 
 

Research
Public policy
Non-profit organizations based in New York (state)
Non-profit organizations based in California